Zhailauov is a surname. Notable people with the surname include:

Gani Zhailauov (born 1985), Kazakhstani boxer
Talgat Zhailauov (born 1985), Kazakhstani ice hockey player